Dakkili mandal is one of the 34 mandals in Tirupati district in the Indian state of Andhra Pradesh. It is a part of Gudur revenue division.

History 
Dakkili mandal was a part of Nellore district until 2022. It was made part of the newly formed Tirupati district effective from 4 April 2022.

Demographics 

Scheduled Castes and Scheduled Tribes made up 11,656 and 4,976 of the population respectively. It had a literacy rate of 56.81% with 64.6% among males and 49.14% among females.

Administration 
Dakkili mandal is a part of Gudur revenue division. As of 2011 census, the mandal comprises the following 50 villages:

 Note: Dattanagaram, Gollavarigunta, Kothacheruvu, Namasivayapuram, Noothalacheruvu, Swarnayacha Samudram and Vedurugunta were uninhabited

Politics 
Dakkili mandal is a part of Venkatagiri Assembly constituency and Tirupati Lok Sabha constituency. , the mandal had 29,925 eligible voters with 14,822 male voters and 15,103 female voters.

References 

Mandals in Tirupati district